Salute John Citizen is a 1942 black and white British drama film directed by Maurice Elvey and starring Edward Rigby, Mabel Constanduros and Jimmy Hanley. The Bunting family face up to the fortunes of war during the Second World War.

Plot
The life of an ordinary family during the London Blitz. In the summer before that explosive September, elderly clerk Mr. Bunting (Edward Rigby) loses his job at the Department store where he's worked for over 40 years. George Bunting is the head of a happy home, with wife Mary (Mabel Constanduros), daughter Julie (Peggy Cummins), and two sons, Chris (Eric Micklewood) and Ernest (Jimmy Hanley). When the Blitz hits London, we observe its effect on the family, and how they cope with the crisis. Mr. Bunting is rehired in his former job due to the shortage of manpower, though little else in his life is positive. Daughter Julie goes to work in a factory. The London blitz destroys everything in sight, and one of his sons, Chris, is killed. In the wake of this destruction, his other son, Ernest is converted from pacifism to the war effort.

Cast
 Edward Rigby as Mr. Bunting 
 Mabel Constanduros as Mrs. Bunting 
 Jimmy Hanley as Ernest Bunting 
 Eric Micklewood as Chris Bunting 
 Peggy Cummins as Julie Bunting 
 Dinah Sheridan as Evie 
 Charles Deane as Bert Rollo 
 Stanley Holloway as Oskey 
 George Robey as Corder 
 David Keir as Turner

Reception
Allmovie described the film as " a simple, low-pressure study of the wartime "home front."...in its own quiet, unassuming war, Salute John Citizen paints a truer portrait of a proud populace besieged by war than the more celebrated Mrs. Miniver "; and TV Guide noted "a nice little film--a simple telling of a modest family's attempts to cope with ongoing conflict" while in his book Typical Men: The Representation of Masculinity in Popular British Cinema, Andrew Spicer concluded that the films "popularity was limited by its obviously frugal budget, and uncharismatic central star."

References

External links
 

1942 films
1942 drama films
1940s English-language films
Films directed by Maurice Elvey
British drama films
British black-and-white films
Films shot at British National Studios
1940s British films